The seventeenth season of Law & Order: Special Victims Unit debuted on Wednesday, September 23, 2015 on NBC, and concluded on Wednesday, May 25, 2016.

Production
Law & Order: Special Victims Unit was renewed for a seventeenth season on February 5, 2015, by NBC. Mariska Hargitay (Olivia Benson) had her contract renewed for season 17, as well as Ice-T (Det. Fin Tutuola). It was announced in March 2015 that season seventeen would be show runner/executive producer Warren Leight's last season on the show: Leight signed a three-year deal with Sony Pictures Television that allowed him to work on SVU for one final season. Production on season seventeen started in late May 2015 on the two-hour season premiere, afterwards the cast and crew took a hiatus and resumed filming on August 21, 2015. Executive producer Leight shared via Twitter that star Mariska Hargitay would be directing an episode this season as well, tweeting "Of course Mariska will direct again this year. After 17 seasons, she's in a class of her own."  Hargitay ultimately directed two episodes: "A Misunderstanding" and "Sheltered Outcasts."

Storylines and cast changes
It was announced at the end of the sixteenth season that star Danny Pino (who portrayed Detective Nick Amaro) would be departing the cast; however, the producers did not kill off his character, leaving open the possibility of a return. Leight said to The Hollywood Reporter on character departures, "I try to leave that door open. I would like to be able to bring [Pino] back. At this point, it depends on where he is and what he's doing and what the story needs. That's one of the advantages of not killing a character that you like." Warren Leight told TV Guide that season seventeen's theme would focus on change and transitions whereas last season (the sixteenth) focused on family; "it should be a year where wherever everyone starts at the beginning of the [season] is not where they end." Leight added that more character development would be in store for Raúl Esparza's ADA Barba and Peter Scanavino's Det. Carisi, as well as Benson (Hargitay) being promoted to Lieutenant.

Star Kelli Giddish (Detective Amanda Rollins), who gave birth to her first child in October 2015, had her character immersed in a pregnancy storyline. In the premiere episode, Rollins learns that she is pregnant, and tells Carisi and Benson of the news; however she also tells her co-workers that Amaro is not the father. In the fifth episode, "Community Policing," it is revealed that Lt. Declan Murphy (Donal Logue) is the father of Rollins' baby.  She gives birth to a healthy baby girl after the events of the ninth episode, "Depravity Standard".
On April 28, 2015, it was announced that SVU producers were planning a "transgender episode" for this season, "ripping from the headlines" Caitlyn Jenner's recent publicized transition. Warren Leight told Variety, "The world keeps evolving, and there are a lot of dark areas that we need to look at ... part of my challenge and everybody's challenge here is to keep it fresh and to not let a groove turn into a rut, and that can happen for any show at any time ... everyone here is really invested in keeping the show fresh and keeping the show on. We view every year's upfronts as a place to prove that we still deserve to be here." The episode, "Transgender Bridge", aired on September 30.

At the 2015 Television Critics Association's summer press tour Law & Order and Chicago franchise creator Dick Wolf announced that there would be a four-show crossover between SVU and the three Chicago shows (Fire, P.D., and Med) as well as announcing a desire by him and other producers for the revival of the original Law & Order series. However, in December 2015, Chicago P.D. showrunner Matt Olmstead revealed that there were no plans for a four-show crossover and that it would only be done if the producers found the right way to do it. Instead, a two-show crossover between SVU and P.D. aired in February 2016.

Cast

Main cast

 Mariska Hargitay as Sergeant / Lieutenant Olivia Benson
 Kelli Giddish as Junior Detective Amanda Rollins
 Ice-T as Senior Detective Fin Tutuola
 Peter Scanavino as Junior Detective Dominick "Sonny" Carisi, Jr.
 Raúl Esparza as Assistant District Attorney Rafael Barba

Special guest stars
 Donal Logue as Lieutenant Declan Murphy
 BD Wong as FBI Special Agent Dr. George Huang
 Jason Beghe as Chicago Police Department Sergeant Hank Voight
 Sophia Bush as Chicago Police Department Detective Erin Lindsay
 Jon Seda as Chicago Police Department Detective Antonio Dawson
 Richard Belzer as District Attorney Investigator John Munch

Recurring cast

 Andy Karl as Sergeant Mike Dodds
 Bronwyn Reed as Lucy Huston
 Peter Gallagher as Deputy Chief William Dodds
 Tamara Tunie as Medical Examiner Dr. Melinda Warner
 Robert John Burke as Internal Affairs Bureau Lieutenant / Captain Ed Tucker
 Elizabeth Marvel as Defense Attorney Rita Calhoun
 Delaney Williams as Defense Attorney John Buchanan
 Dallas Roberts as Dr. Gregory Yates
 Jefferson Mays as Medical Examiner Dr. Carl Rudnick
 Robert Sean Leonard as Assistant District Attorney Kenneth O'Dwyer
 Josh Pais as Deputy Commissioner Hank Abraham
 Scott William Winters as Detective Joe Dumas
 Caris Vujcec as Detective Louise Campesi
 Jason Cerbone as Defense Attorney Lorenzo Desappio
 Jenna Stern as Judge Elana Barth
 Lindsay Pulsipher as Kim Rollins

 Jessica Phillips as Assistant District Attorney Pippa Cox
 Stephen C. Bradbury as Judge Colin McNamara
 Steve Rosen as Defence Attorney Michael Guthrie
 Tabitha Holbert as Assistant District Attorney Rose Callier
 Ami Brabson as Judge Karyn Blake
 Sonia Manzano as Judge Gloria Pepitone
 Betsy Aidem as Dr Sloane
 Max Baker as Colin Bennett
 Vincent Curatola as Judge Al Burtuccio
 Yvonna Kopacz-Wright as Dr. Darby Wilder
 Michael Mastro as Judge Serani
 Mary Hodges as Judge Anita Wright
 Lauren Noble as Carmen
 Karen Tsen Lee as Medical Examiner Susan Chung
 Leslie Odom Jr. as Reverend Curtis Scott
 Dashiell Eaves as Sergeant Kevin Donlan

Guest stars

It was announced in May 2015, that Dallas Roberts would return to SVU in the two-hour season premiere as serial rapist/killer, Dr. Gregory Yates from the sixteenth season two-hour crossover episode "Daydream Believer" with Chicago P.D.. The premiere episode was "ripped from the headlines" and surrounded Robert Durst, his murder trial, and explored some of his possible connections to a series of rape/murders that span 20 years.

Danny Burstein and Rebecca Luker appeared in "Transgender Bridge" as the parents of a transgender teen who is assaulted. The two theatre stars are married in real life.

Whoopi Goldberg was cast in a guest starring role for the October 7 episode "Institutional Fail". Goldberg portrayed Janette Grayson, a Department of Child Services supervisor whose allegedly fake reports put multiple children at risk. Grayson finds herself on trial when the agency's internal policies bring in the wrong kind of publicity. Peter Gallagher also guest stars in the same episode, reprising his role of Chief Dodds, alongside Goldberg, Jessica Pimental and John Magaro.

In "Community Policing", Donal Logue returned to SVU as Lt. Declan Murphy, after finding out about Rollins' pregnancy. Rollins revealed to Murphy that he is the father of her child. Actors from Broadway's Hamilton, Leslie Odom, Jr. and Daveed Diggs also guest-starred in "Community Policing". Daveed Diggs returns in "Forty One Witnesses," alongside "Hamilton" costar Anthony Ramos.

Andy Karl was cast in the recurring role of Sgt. Mike Dodds, son of Chief William Dodds (played by Peter Gallagher). His character was introduced to the unit as Benson's No. 2. This reunited Karl and Gallagher after starring in the 2015 Broadway revival of the musical On the Twentieth Century.

Lindsay Pulsipher returned this season to portray Kim Rollins, Amanda's sister, who was last seen in the season fourteen episode, "Deadly Ambition". Kim brings their mother with her to New York, Beth Anne Rollins, (portrayed by Virginia Madsen) who feels her police-officer daughter has turned her back on the family. Warren Leight commented to TV Guide, "Even if their intent is to be supportive, and I'm not even sure it is, her family showing up is not a great thing for her – nothing good comes from seeing her sister or her mother."

Christopher Sieber and Geneva Carr guest starred in the episode "Patrimonial Burden" as the parents of a large, religious family known for their reality show. The episode was inspired by the Joshua Duggar molestation scandal and also featured Chris Elliott as a crew member on the show. Elliott previously appeared in the tenth season episode "Lunacy", while Carr had appeared in two previous episodes, making this her third character portrayal on the series (not to mention her appearances on other iterations of the Law & Order universe).

Carolee Carmello, Nick Cordero, and Ali Wentworth all guested in the eighth episode "Melancholy Pursuit".

Former series regular BD Wong reprised his role as Dr. George Huang in the episode "Depravity Standard". The storyline revisited the case from the fourteenth season episode "Manhattan Vigil", and saw Huang testify in court for the defense. This episode marked Wong's fourth guest appearance on the series following his departure from the main cast in the twelfth season.

Roberts reprised his role of Yates in "Nationwide Manhunt", which starts a crossover with Chicago P.D. that concludes on "The Song of Gregory William Yates".  Jason Beghe, Sophia Bush, Jon Seda also guest starred in the crossover. Seda previously appeared in a crossover episode of the original Law & Order as Detective Paul Falsone from Homicide: Life on the Street.

Kevin Tighe, who played Gregory Searle in the season 9 episode "Avatar", reprises his role in "Sheltered Outcasts" as a patient in a level three sex offender rehabilitation center.

Former series regular Richard Belzer reprised his role as John Munch in the episode "Fashionable Crimes", where Munch returns to SVU to assist in the case of a young model who claims to have been preyed upon by a famous fashion photographer.  Munch and Fin had their eyes on the photographer in the past, but were unable to build a case at the time.

In April 2016, it was announced that Brad Garrett would guest star in the two-part season finale which aired on May 18 and 25. He portrayed the role of Gary Munson, a correctional officer who holds a reputation of being a family man, along with a history of corruption and violence against women.

Episodes

Reception

References

External links
 Official episode guide
 Season 17 episodes at MSN.com
 Season 17 episodes at IMDb.com

17
2015 American television seasons
2016 American television seasons